Jordan Shane Stephens (born September 12, 1992) is an American professional baseball pitcher for the Charleston Dirty Birds of the Atlantic League of Professional Baseball. He was drafted by the Chicago White Sox in the 2015 Major League Baseball draft.

Career
Stephens attended Alvin High School in Alvin, Texas and played college baseball at Rice University. In 2014, he underwent Tommy John Surgery and missed most of his junior year. He returned from the injury in 2015 and after the season was drafted by the Chicago White Sox in the fifth round of the 2015 Major League Baseball draft.

Chicago White Sox
Stephens pitched his first professional season with both the Arizona League White Sox and Great Falls Voyagers, posting a combined 0.51 ERA in  innings pitched between both teams. In 2016, he pitched for the Winston-Salem Dash, pitching to a 7–10 record and 3.45 ERA in 27 games started. He spent 2017 with the Birmingham Barons, posting a 3–7 record with a 3.14 ERA in only 16 starts due to missing the first two months of the season because of tendinitis in his right elbow. The White Sox added Stephens to their 40-man roster after the 2018 season. He began 2019 with the Charlotte Knights and also played in one game with Winston-Salem.

Cleveland Indians
Stephens was claimed off waivers by the Cleveland Indians on June 15, 2019. He was assigned to the Akron RubberDucks. On August 30, Stephens was designated for assignment. After clearing waivers, Stephens was outrighted to the Triple-A Columbus Clippers on September 2, 2019. Stephens did not play in a game in 2020 due to the cancellation of the minor league season because of the COVID-19 pandemic. Stephens elected free agency on November 7, 2021.

Charleston Dirty Birds
On February 17, 2022, Stephens signed with the Charleston Dirty Birds of the Atlantic League of Professional Baseball.

References

External links

Rice Owls bio

1992 births
Living people
Akron RubberDucks players
Arizona League White Sox players
Baseball pitchers
Baseball players from Houston
Birmingham Barons players
Charlotte Knights players
Columbus Clippers players
Great Falls Voyagers players
Rice Owls baseball players
Winston-Salem Dash players